Davide Mastaj (born 30 April 1998) is an Italian footballer who plays for La Biellese.

Club career

Parma
He started his senior career in the fifth-tier Eccellenza league with Colorno. After joining the youth team of Parma on loan for the 2016–17 season, Parma signed him on a permanent basis on 30 August 2017. He played for their Under-19 squad in the 2017–18 season. He was called up to the senior squad 14 times, but remained on the bench in all those games.

Loan to Trapani
On 31 August 2018, he joined Serie C club Trapani on a season-long loan.

He made his professional Serie C debut for Trapani on 17 March 2019 in a game against Virtus Francavilla. He replaced Daniele Ferretti in the 74th minute. He finished his loan with making just that one appearance.

Loan to Carpi
On 2 September 2019, he moved to another Serie C club Carpi on a season-long loan.

Personal life
Born in Italy, Mastaj is of Polish descent.

References

External links
 

1998 births
Living people
Italian footballers
Footballers from Campania
Italian people of Polish descent
Sportspeople from the Province of Caserta
Association football forwards
Parma Calcio 1913 players
Trapani Calcio players
A.C. Carpi players
Serie C players
Serie D players